"The Rose Garden" is a ghost story by British writer  M. R. James, included in his 1911 collection More Ghost Stories of an Antiquary.

Plot summary 
Mrs. Anstruther would like to plant a rose garden, however the clearing she wishes to use gives people nightmares, and they hear whispers by an old post in the clearing. Soon she, along with her husband, learn the history of the clearing and the injustice that took place there.

References

External links

 
Full text of "The Rose Garden"

A Podcast to the Curious: Episode 9 - The Rose Garden

Short stories by M. R. James
Horror short stories
1911 short stories